De cabaret-prinses is a 1925 Dutch silent film directed by Theo Frenkel.

Cast
 Emmy Arbous - La Manuela, de cabaret-prinses
 August Van den Hoeck - Schipper
 Esther De Boer-van Rijk - Schippersvrouw
 Co Balfoort - Willem
 André van Dijk - Hendrik
 Agnès Marou - Jeanne
 Rika de la Mar Kleij - Koopvrouw
 Jacques Van Bijlevelt - Impresario
 Louis van Gasteren Sr. - Intrigant
 Coen Hissink - Paria
 Hans Bruening - Dominee

External links 
 

Dutch silent feature films
1925 films
Dutch black-and-white films
Films directed by Theo Frenkel